The 2021 W Series Budapest round was the fourth round of seven in the 2021 W Series, and took place at the Hungaroring in Budapest on 31 July 2021. The event was an undercard to the 2021 Formula One World Championship round at the same circuit.

Report

Background
Caitlin Wood replaced Abbi Pulling in the Puma W Series Team.

Alice Powell led the championship on 54 points, 6 points ahead of Jamie Chadwick.

Race
Chadwick stormed away from pole position to take a commanding lead into the first corner, while Irina Sidorkova hung around the outside of Beitske Visser to take fourth. Further back, Ayla Ågren and Fabienne Wohlwend ran wide – the Norwegian slowed suddenly and caused Wohlwend to hit the back of her car, launch into the air and broke her front wing in the process, requiring a pit-stop.

Chadwick and Powell began to sprint away from Nerea Martí in third by around a second a lap, as Sidorkova and Visser began battling over fourth. Other battles in the field included Marta García and Emma Kimiläinen for sixth, as well as Belén García and a slow-starting Bruna Tomaselli for eighth. Sabré Cook meanwhile had made up five places from the start but began to fall back through the field as Miki Koyama overtook her for 13th, not helped by her side mirrors bending from an impact with a kerb. A bad day was made worse for the Bunker team when Wohlwend, who was suffering from further damage after the first lap incident, went a lap down after her pit-stop and then chose to retire the car after half-distance.

Marta García had begun to pull away from Kimiläinen but a mistake from the Spaniard saw her run wide at turn 11, allowing the Écurie W driver to draw alongside and overtake into turn 13. Another driver making moves was Koyama, who closed on the back of Abbie Eaton quicker than she was expecting – light front to rear contact was made at turn 2, before the Japanese driver also braved it around the outside of turn 3 to pass The Grand Tour test driver for 12th.

Chadwick eased to victory with a ten-second gap to title rival Powell in second. Martí scored her first podium and the second for the Academy team, team-mate Sidorkova holding out Visser and coming in 5 seconds behind Martí. Series returnee Caitlin Wood started and finished 17th after some mechanical issues on the rear end of her car led to misaligned tracking.

Classification

Practice

Qualifying

Race

Championship standings

See also
 2021 Hungarian Grand Prix

Notes

References

External links
 Official website
 Race replay

|- style="text-align:center"
|width="35%"|Previous race:
|width="30%"|W Series2021 season
|width="40%"|Next race:

W Series Budapest
W Series Budapest
Budapest
W Series Budapest